Ceratocnemum is a genus of flowering plants belonging to the family Brassicaceae.

Its native range is Northwestern Africa.

Species:
 Ceratocnemum rapistroides Coss. & Balansa

References

Brassicaceae
Brassicaceae genera